"" ("Destroy What Destroys You") is a 1970 song by German proto-punk band  and a subsequent political slogan. Written in 1969, it first appeared as a single the next year, followed by the band's 1971 debut album  The slogan was subsequently used in the German autonomous, squatting, and contemporary anarchist outgrowths of the 1960s West German student movement.

Background 
It followed a scene in which the titular hero, the young worker Paul, sees conservative commentator  on television and throws the TV set on the floor in anger.

The lyrics were written by Norbert Krause, a member of Hoffmanns Comic Teater, inspired by lyrics by Rio Reiser: "Bombs are falling / Tanks are rolling / Soldiers dying / Men are crying / It is a good time ...". These lyrics were inspired in turn by Bob Dylan's "Subterranean Homesick Blues".

In mid-1970, ARD broadcast a documentary entitled  ("Five fingers make a fist") about the aims of the APO. Viewers called the station to ask how to buy the music. By Christmas 1970 it had already sold over 6000 copies.

Love and Peace Festival 
The band's first performance was on September 6, 1970, at the Fehmarn . By the time they took the stage (the stage on which Jimi Hendrix had just given his last concert), the organizers had already left, taking the proceeds of the box office with them. Reiser called on the audience to "smash the organizers into the ground". By the time they played "", their third song, the office was set on fire; two songs later, the stage was burning too. Many people believed that  had set the stage on fire, which gave them tremendous credibility in the radical scene.

Legacy 
In 1971, the song appeared on the album . It became one of the best-known of 's songs. The title soon became a motto for the protests of the 1970s and was used on all kinds of fliers and graffiti. 

The song "" ("Fix what breaks you!") (2007) from the album of the same name by Tommy Finke is a reference to "" and Rio Reiser, whose "" is also alluded to. "Destroy What Destroys You", by German thrash metal band Kreator, is also a reference to "". The song was released on the Hordes of Chaos album in 2008.

References

Further reading 

 
 Jean-Luc Godard, Cinema Historian
 West Germany and the Global Sixties: The Anti-Authoritarian Revolt, 1962–1978

1970 songs
Autonomism
Proto-punk
Punk rock songs
Protest songs
Songs about police brutality
Songs about revolutions
Anarchist songs
Songs against capitalism
Songs about labor
German songs
German-language songs
Left-wing politics in Germany
New Left
German rock songs